William M. Corry Jr. (1889–1920) was a U.S. Navy officer and Medal of Honor recipient.

William Corry may also refer to:

William Corry (Cincinnati mayor) (1779–1833), American politician in Ohio
Sir William Corry, 2nd Baronet (1859–1926), of the Corry baronets
Sir William James Corry, 4th Baronet (1924–2000), of the Corry baronets

See also
 William Cory (disambiguation)
Will Corrie, British actor of the silent era
Corry (disambiguation)